Congrogadus is a genus of ray-finned fishes, the type genus of the subfamily Congrogadinae, the eel blennies, part of the dottyback family, Pseudochromidae. The genus Congrogadus has an Indo-Pacific distribution.

Characteristics
The species in the genus Congrogadus  differ from their other genera in the subfamily Congogadinae in that they do not have a spot on their shoulder, a similar spot beingloacted on the operculum. Their dorsal and anal fins have a higher number of rays than all the other species in the subfamily except for the species in the genus Halidesmus which can have up to 90 fin rays. Also compared to the related genera which may have three complete lateral lines, the species in Congrogadus have only have a single curtailed lateral line. In addition some species which are classified in the subgenus Congrogadoides have the gill membranes fused to the isthmus. The gill membranes of the subgenus Congrogadus are not fused while the species in that subgebus and in the third, Pilbaraichthys possess a posterior otic sensory canal pore, which is believed to assist the fish in detecting motion.

Biology
They feed mainly on crustaceans but larger specimens will take fish, and their large mouth enable them to swallow quite large prey. All of this subfamily lay eggs in a small clump. The eggs of species within Congragadus are a distinguishing feature of the genus as each egg is attached to a small hook which has a thin thread. When the egg mass begins to disintegrate the hook falls from the egg to be suspended underneath it by the thread. It is thought this allows the egg to attach itself to the substrate.

Distribution
The genus is found in the Indian Ocean and the western Pacific Ocean and some species have rather restricted distributions while c. subducens has been claimed over a wide distribution from northern Australia through the Malay Archipelago to Japan, although other sources state that it is endemic to Australia.

Species
The following species are classified as members of the genus Congrogadus:

 Subgenus Congrogadoides
 Congrogadus amplimaculatus (Winterbottom, 1980) (Largespot eel blenny)
 Congrogadus malayanus (Weber, 1909) (Malayan eel blenny)
 Congrogadus spinifer (Borodin, 1933) (Spiny eel blenny)
 Subgenus Congradadus
 Congrogadus hierichthys D.S. Jordan & R.E. Richardson, 1908 (Sulu eel blenny)
 Congrogadus subducens (Richardson, 1843) (Carpet eel-blenny)
 Subgenus Pilbaraichthys
 Congrogadus winterbottomi A.C. Gill, Mooi & Hutchins, 2000 (Pilbara eelblenny)

References

Congrogadinae
Taxa named by Albert Günther